The 1938 La Flèche Wallonne was the third edition of La Flèche Wallonne cycle race and was held on 1 May 1938. The race started in Tournai and finished in Rocourt. The race was won by Émile Masson.

General classification

References

1938 in road cycling
1938
1938 in Belgian sport